Emil R. Bedard (born 3 December 1943) is a retired lieutenant general in the United States Marine Corps who served as Deputy Commandant for Plans, Policies and Operations. He attended Mayville State University and the University of North Dakota and was commissioned in 1967.

References

1943 births
Living people
United States Marine Corps generals